Tomoko Sugawara is a harpist from Tokyo, Japan who grew up playing classical and Irish harp before learning to play the kugo or angular harp.  With Swedish professor Bo Lawergren, whom she met at a kugo museum exhibit in Nara, Japan she engineered a fully working model of a kugo and hired American harp builder Bill Campbell to construct it.  After adjusting to the soft sound of the model, she recorded a CD on Motéma Music called Along the Silk Road, released in 2010, which was a nominee for the Independent Music Awards in the Traditional/World category.  She worked with flutist Robert Dick and bendir and darabukka player Ozan Aksöy for pieces composed by Kikuko Masumoto, Stephen Dydo (based on music from the Tang Dynasty), Quţh al-Din al-Shīrāzī (1236-1311, Iran), Robert Lombardo, Amir Mahyar Tafreshipour, and Sugawara's own arrangements of works by Alfonso X.

Biography
Sugawara began playing Irish harp at age 12, then moved to the concert harp at age 16.  She graduated from Tokyo University of Fine Arts with the concert harp as her main instrument.  She began her work with the kugo in 1991.  She has performed recitals of both concert harp and kugo at the World Harp Congress (in Prague and Amsterdam), Indiana University, Columbia University, Harvard University, University of Pennsylvania, Princeton University, and The British Museum.

References
Gallafent, Alex.  "Harpist Tomoko Sugawara."  Public Radio International's The World, May 3, 2010.

External links
Official Site
Tomoko Sugawara at Motéma Music

Living people
Japanese harpists
Musicians from Tokyo
Year of birth missing (living people)
Motéma Music artists